Patricia Brülhart (born 29 January 1968) is a Swiss breaststroke swimmer. She competed at the 1984 Summer Olympics and the 1988 Summer Olympics.

References

External links
 

1968 births
Living people
Swiss female breaststroke swimmers
Olympic swimmers of Switzerland
Swimmers at the 1984 Summer Olympics
Swimmers at the 1988 Summer Olympics
Place of birth missing (living people)
20th-century Swiss women